Villiaumite is a rare halide mineral composed of sodium fluoride, NaF. It is very soluble in water and some specimens fluoresce under long and short wave ultraviolet light. It has a Mohs hardness of 2.5 and is usually red, pink, or orange in color. It is toxic to humans.

The red color is due to a broad absorption peaking at 512 nm.  It is a result of radiation damage to the crystal.

Occurrence

It occurs in nepheline syenite intrusives and in nepheline syenite pegmatites. It occurs associated with aegirine, sodalite, nepheline, neptunite, lamprophyllite, pectolite, serandite, eudialyte, ussingite, chkalovite and zeolites. It has been reported from Minas Gerais, Brazil; Mont Saint-Hilaire, Quebec, Canada; the Ilimaussaq complex of Greenland; Lake Magadi, Kenya; Windhoek District, Namibia; the Fen Complex, Telemark, Norway; the Khibiny and Lovozero Massifs, Kola Peninsula, Russia; Porphyry Mountain, Boulder County, Colorado and Point of Rocks Mesa, Colfax County, New Mexico, US.

It was first described in 1908 for an occurrence in Los Islands, Guinea and named after the French explorer, Maxime Villiaume.

See also
 List of minerals

References

Sodium minerals
Fluorine minerals
Cubic minerals
Minerals in space group 227
Rocksalt group